Clube Desportivo Marítimo Micoló is a football club that plays in the village of Micoló located near Guadalupe in the island of São Tomé Island League in São Tomé and Príncipe.  The team never won any titles.

The club took part in the 2001 island cup where they succeeded as high as the semifinal match.  The club was in the second division until they were qualified into the island first division in the 2006–07 season and then relegated again.

In the Second Division, the club played for Zone B for the 2011 season and did not compete above the Second Division. In 2016, Micoló was inside the relegation zone after finishing 11th, the last two position and thus was relegated.  Marítimo Micoló is now in the island's lowest, the third division for the season.

League and cup history

Island championships

References

External links
Club profile at the Final Ball

Football clubs in São Tomé and Príncipe
Lobata District
São Tomé Island Third Division